Chitrabhanu was a mathematician of the Kerala school and a student of Nilakantha Somayaji. He was a Nambudiri brahmin from the town of Covvaram near present day Trissur. Nilakantha and he were both teachers of Shankara Variyar.

Contributions
He gave integer solutions to 21 types of systems of two simultaneous Diophantine equations in two unknowns. These types are all the possible pairs of equations of the following seven forms:

For each case, Chitrabhanu gave an explanation and justification of his rule as well as an example. Some of his explanations are algebraic, while others are geometric.

References

Kerala school of astronomy and mathematics
15th-century births
16th-century deaths
16th-century Indian mathematicians